The article list the confirmed women's squads for Olympic Hockey Tournament at the 2000 Summer Olympics in Sydney, Australia.

Pool C

Argentina
Head Coach: Sergio Vigil

Mariela Antoniska (GK)
Soledad García
Magdalena Aicega
María Paz Ferrari
Anabel Gambero
Ayelén Stepnik
Inés Arrondo
Luciana Aymar
Vanina Oneto
Jorgelina Rimoldi
Karina Masotta (c)
Paola Vukojicic (GK)
Laura Maiztegui
Mercedes Margalot
María de la Paz Hernández
Cecilia Rognoni

Australia
Head Coach: Robert Haigh

Alyson Annan
Juliet Haslam
Alison Peek
Claire Mitchell-Taverner
Kate Starre
Kate Allen
Lisa Carruthers
Rechelle Hawkes
Clover Maitland (GK)
Rachel Imison (GK)
Angie Skirving
Julie Towers
Renita Garard
Jenn Morris
Katrina Powell
Nikki Hudson

Great Britain
Head Coach: Chris Spice

Carolyn Reid (GK)
Hilary Rose (GK)
Kirsty Bowden
Jane Smith
Melanie Clewlow
Tina Cullen
Kath Johnson
Lucilla Wright
Jane Sixsmith
Rhona Simpson
Denise Marston-Smith
Helen Richardson
Fiona Greenham
Pauline Stott (c)
Kate Walsh
Mandy Nicholson

Korea
Head Coach: Park Shin

Park Yong-suk (GK)
Lee Seon-hwa
Kim Eun-jin
Kim Mi-hyeon
Sin Mi-gyeong
Bang Jin-hyeok
Kim Seong-eun
Kim Su-jeong
Oh Seung-Shin
Kim Myung-Ok (c)
Lee Eun-Young
Jeong Hang-ju (GK)
Park Eun-Kyung
Jo Bo-ra
Yu Hui-ju
O Go-un

Spain
Head Coach: Marc Lammers

Elena Carrión (GK)
Nuria Moreno
Amanda González
María Carmen Barea
Sonia de Ignacio (c)
María del Carmen Martín
Sonia Barrio
Silvia Muñoz
Lucía López
María del Mar Feito
Maider Tellería
Elena Urkizu
Begoña Larzabal
Erdoitza Goikoetxea
Cibeles Romero (GK)
Núria Camón

Pool D

China
Head Coach: Kim Chang

Nie Yali (GK)
Long Fengyu (c)
Yang Hongbing
Liu Lijie
Cheng Hui
Shen Lihong
Huang Junxia
Yang Huiping
Yu Yali
Tang Chunling
Zhou Wanfeng
Hou Xiaolan
Ding Hongping (GK)
Cai Xuemei
Chen Zhaoxia
Wang Jiuyan

Germany
Head Coach: Berthold Rauth

Julia Zwehl (GK)
Birgit Beyer
Denise Klecker
Tanja Dickenscheid
Nadine Ernsting-Krienke
Inga Möller
Natascha Keller
Friederike Barth
Britta Becker
Marion Rodewald
Heike Lätzsch
Katrin Kauschke (c)
Simone Grässer
Fanny Rinne
Caroline Casaretto
Franziska Gude

Netherlands
Head Coach: Tom van 't Hek

Clarinda Sinnige (GK)
Macha van der Vaart
Julie Deiters
Fatima Moreira de Melo
Hanneke Smabers
Dillianne van den Boogaard (c)
Margje Teeuwen
Mijntje Donners
Ageeth Boomgaardt
Myrna Veenstra
Minke Smabers
Carole Thate (c)
Fleur van de Kieft
Suzan van der Wielen
Minke Booij
Daphne Touw (GK)

New Zealand
Head Coach: Jan Borren

Skippy Hamahona
Moira Senior
Kylie Foy (c)
Sandy Bennett
Diana Weavers
Rachel Petrie
Anna Lawrence
Jenny Duck
Kate Trolove
Michelle Turner
Mandy Smith
Suzie Pearce
Anne-Marie Irving (GK)
Helen Clarke (GK)
Caryn Paewai
Tina Bell-Kake

South Africa
Head Coach: Gene Muller

Paola Vidulich (GK)
Inke van Wyk (GK)
Jacqueline Geyser
Carina van Zyl
Anli Kotze
Michele MacNaughton
Karen Roberts (c)
Lindsey Carlisle
Karen Symons
Kerry Bee
Pietie Coetzee
Alison Dare
Luntu Ntloko
Marilyn Agliotti
Caryn Bentley
Susan Wessels

References

External links

Squads
2000